The Minister of Employment and Social Development was a position in the Canadian government from 2013 to 2015. Its responsibilities are now split between:

 the Minister of Employment, Workforce Development and Disability Inclusion, and
 the Minister of Families, Children and Social Development